This article shows the rosters of all participating teams at the 2015 FIVB Volleyball Women's World Cup in Japan.

The following is the Algerian roster in the 2015 FIVB Volleyball Women's World Cup.

Head coach: Henni Abdelhalim

The following is the Argentine roster in the 2015 FIVB Volleyball Women's World Cup.

Head coach: Guillermo Orduna

The following is the Chinese roster in the 2015 FIVB Volleyball Women's World Cup.

Head coach: Lang Ping

The following is the Cuban roster in the 2015 FIVB Volleyball Women's World Cup.

Head coach: Juan Carlos Gala

The following is the Dominican roster in the 2015 FIVB Volleyball Women's World Cup.

Head coach: Marcos Kwiek

The following is the Japanese roster in the 2015 FIVB Volleyball Women's World Cup.

Head coach: Masayoshi Manabe

The following is the Kenyan roster in the 2015 FIVB Volleyball Women's World Cup.

Head coach: David Lung'aho

The following is the Peruvian roster in the 2015 FIVB Volleyball Women's World Cup.

Head coach: Mauro Marasciulo

The following is the Russian roster in the 2015 FIVB Volleyball Women's World Cup.

Head coach: Yuri Marichev

The following is the Serbian roster in the 2015 FIVB Volleyball Women's World Cup.

Head coach: Zoran Terzić

The following is the Korean roster in the 2015 FIVB Volleyball Women's World Cup.

Head coach: Lee Jung-chul

The following is the American roster in the 2015 FIVB Volleyball Women's World Cup.

Head coach: Karch Kiraly

See also
2015 FIVB Volleyball Men's World Cup squads

References

External links
Official website

F
S
Volleyball qualification for the 2016 Summer Olympics
Vol